The  Philadelphia Eagles season was the franchise's 45th season in the National Football League (NFL). The team improved upon their previous output of 4–10, winning five games. Despite the improvement, the team failed to qualify for the playoffs for the seventeenth consecutive season.

Offseason

NFL Draft

Player selections 
The table shows the Eagles selections and what picks they had that were traded away and the team that ended up with that pick. It is possible the Eagles' pick ended up with this team via another team that the Eagles made a trade with.
Not shown are acquired picks that the Eagles traded away.

Roster

Schedule 

Note: Intra-division opponents are in bold text.

Standings

Regular season

Week 1: vs. Tampa Bay Buccaneers 
at Veterans Stadium in Philadelphia, Pennsylvania
Television CBS
Announcers: Frank Glieber, Johnny Unitas

Quarterback Ron Jaworski threw two touchdown passes and the defense allowed just 152 yards as the Eagles got their first opening-day victory in 10 years. Jaworski, playing for the Eagles for the first time since being traded from the Los Angeles Rams for tight end Charle Young, floated a seven-yard touchdown pass in the first period to running back Tom Sullivan. After Bucs kicker Dave Green kicked a 22-yard field goal in the third quarter to reduce the Eagles' lead to 7–3, Jaworski hit Keith Krepfle with a 17-yard score.
The last time the Eagles had won their season opener was 1967 when they beat the Washington Redskins. It was the 15th straight loss for the Buccaneers, who entered the league in 1976 and had yet to win a game. The Eagles' defense, led by defensive end Art Thomas who had recently been obtained from Oakland, and linebacker Bill Bergey, gave up 82 yards on the ground and 70 in the air.

Week 4: at New York Giants 
at Giants Stadium i East Rutherford, New Jersey
Television CBS
Announcers: Pat Summerall, Tom Brookshier

Ron Jaworski hit tight end Keith Krepfle for a 55-yard touchdown pass and Charlie Smith with a 28-yarder, and Herb Lusk ran for touchdowns of 1 and 70 yards in a steady rain as Philadelphia evened their season record at 2–2 with an impressive road victory over the New York Giants. Giants QB Joe Pisarcik, who would later join the Eagles in 1980, threw an 80-yard touchdown pass to Jimmy Robinson for New York's only TD of the day.

Week 8: vs. New Orleans Saints 
at Veterans Stadium in Philadelphia, Pennsylvania
Television: CBS
Announcers: Don Criqui and Johnny Unitas
Ron Jaworski had a great day, running for two touchdowns and passing for two more, as the Eagles won their third game of the season. In the first half, after Jaworski ran for his first touchdown on a 13-play 68-yard drive, he drove the Eagles on a 6-play 35-yard drive that ended with a 11-yard touchdown pass from Jaworski to Harold Carmichael. In the second half, Eagles' safety John Sanders returned an intercepted pass 26 yards to the Eagles' 7-yard line, where 3 plays later Jaworski passed to Carmichael for another score. The Saints finally got on the scoreboard with an 8-play 62-yard drive that ended with a Bobby Douglass 9-yard touchdown pass to Henry Childs. But the Eagles answered to finish off the Saints with a 10-play 57-yard drive that ended with Jaworski's 2-yard touchdown run to cap a great day for the Eagles, with the final score 28–7.

Notes

References 

Philadelphia Eagles seasons
Philadelphia Eagles
Philadel